Henryk Dembiński (16 January 1791 – 13 July 1864) was a Polish engineer, traveler and general.

Dembiński was born in Strzałków, Świętokrzyskie Voivodeship. In 1809 he entered the Polish army of the Duchy of Warsaw and took part in most of the Napoleonic campaigns in the East. Among others, he took part in the Battle of Leipzig in 1813. After the fall of Napoleon Bonaparte he remained in Poland and became one of the members of the Sejm of the Congress Poland. 
 
In the Polish November Uprising of 1830, he was a successful leader of the Polish forces. In 1831, after his victorious campaign in Lithuania, he was promoted to generał dywizji and for a brief period became the Polish Commander-in-Chief. He took part in the battles of Dębe Wielkie and Ostrołęka.

After the fall of the revolution in 1833 he emigrated to France, where he became one of the prominent politicians of the Hôtel Lambert, a group of supporters of Adam Jerzy Czartoryski.

In the Hungarian revolution of 1848 he was appointed the commanding officer of the Northern Army. After his successes he was soon promoted and Lajos Kossuth appointed him the Hungarian commander-in-chief. He was hampered by the jealousy of Artúr Görgey and after the defeat at the Battle of Kápolna, he resigned. After the Battle of Temesvár (where he was commander until the arrival of Józef Bem) and Kossuth's resignation, he fled to Turkey, where he (together with many other prominent Polish officers) entered the service of sultan Mahmud II. However, in 1850 he returned to Paris, where he died.

Notes

References

Sources 
 

Activists of the Great Emigration
Generals of the November Uprising
Hungarian Revolution of 1848
People from Busko County
People of the Revolutions of 1848
Polish soldiers
Polish commanders of the Napoleonic Wars
1791 births
1864 deaths